Mona Lisa & Others is an album released in 1981 by Australian Rock & Roll singer Barry Stanton.

Track listing
 "Mona Lisa"
 "State Border Line"
 "Married Woman"
 "Days Gone By"
 "Trying To Get To You"
 "Mockingbird" w/Pattie Towers
 "One Night"
 "Beggin' On My Knees"
 "You've Lost Your Way"
 "My Little Girl"

1981 albums
Barry Stanton albums